Trachelipus camerani is a species of woodlouse in the genus Trachelipus belonging to the family Trachelipodidae that can be found in Italy, Greece and the former Yugoslavia.

References

External links

Trachelipodidae
Woodlice of Europe
Crustaceans described in 1900